Natalya Martynova  (born 19 November 1970, in Irkutsk) is a Russian cross-country skier who competed from 1994 to 1998. Her best World Cup finish was third in a 15 km event in Norway in 1994. She also competed at the 1992 Winter Olympics and the 1994 Winter Olympics.

At the 1994 Winter Olympics in Lillehammer, Martynova finished 23rd in the 30 km event. She finished 28th in the 15 km event at the FIS Nordic World Ski Championships 1995 in Thunder Bay, Ontario.

Cross-country skiing results
All results are sourced from the International Ski Federation (FIS).

Olympic Games

World Championships

World Cup

Season standings

Individual podiums

1 podium

Team podiums

 1 victory 
 3 podiums

References

External links

1970 births
Cross-country skiers at the 1992 Winter Olympics
Cross-country skiers at the 1994 Winter Olympics
Living people
Olympic cross-country skiers of Russia
Olympic cross-country skiers of the Unified Team
Russian female cross-country skiers
Sportspeople from Irkutsk